Joel Larsson is a Swedish professional Magic: The Gathering player. He is most known for winning the Pro Tour Magic Origins competition in August 2015, and for his skills in limited formats. Joel had the highest win percentage in the world in limited matches during the 2011-2012 Pro Tour season. He is also known for winning the first Players Tour in 2020.

Playing career 
Joel began playing Magic in 2005 and qualified for his first Pro Tour in 2010, making his debut at Pro Tour San Diego. In his eighth Pro Tour, he reached the finals in Montreal where he lost to Tom Martell. Due to his hairdo and appearance, he received the nickname of "Swedish Kibler" after the tournament. In Sweden, he often goes by the nickname "Proel". With 279 pro points Joel has the highest number of pro points of any Swede. After winning Pro Tour Origins in 2015 he took time off his studies in Computer Science to focus even more on the game. After 2016 he scaled down the time allotted to the game because of his studies in Computer Science at Stockholm University. But he made it back with full force in 2020 winning the first Players Tour.

Achievements

References

Living people
Swedish Magic: The Gathering players
People from Stockholm
1991 births